James Park VC (1835 – 14 June 1858) was a Scottish recipient of the Victoria Cross, the highest and most prestigious award for gallantry in the face of the enemy that can be awarded to British and Commonwealth forces.

Details
Park was approximately 22 years old, and a gunner in the Bengal Artillery, Bengal Army during the Indian Mutiny when the following deeds took place at the Relief of Lucknow for which he was awarded the VC:

He was killed in action in Lucknow, British India on 14 June 1858.

References

Monuments to Courage (David Harvey, 1999)
The Register of the Victoria Cross (This England, 1997)
Scotland's Forgotten Valour (Graham Ross, 1995)

1835 births
1858 deaths
British recipients of the Victoria Cross
Indian Rebellion of 1857 recipients of the Victoria Cross
Military personnel from Glasgow
British military personnel killed in the Indian Rebellion of 1857
Bengal Artillery soldiers